Japanese attempt to increase the size of their puppet state of Inner Mongolia in the Suiyuan campaign.

Inner Mongolia 
Inner Mongolian Army 1936 
 Commander in Chief - Demchugdongrub
 Teh Wang's personal troops
 Li Shouxin's Command: Li Shouxin
 1st, 2nd, 3rd, 4th Cavalry Division and an artillery regiment (Jehol Mongols, Chahar Mongols) 
 Bao Yueqing's Command: Bao Yueqing 
 5th, 6th, 7th, 8th Cavalry Division and an artillery regiment(Mongol irregulars and bandits) 
 9th Division (served as security guard division)
 total: 9,000–10,000 men
Grand Han Righteous Army - Wang Ying 
 4 Brigades  (6,000 men, Japanese trained Chinese soldiers and former bandits)

Japanese: 
 20-30 advisors with each Mongolian unit and Headquarters staff
 A few field artillery pieces and crews 
 30 armoured cars and tankettes and crews
 Crews and ground support for 28 planes

China 

Suiyuan Provincial Forces 1936

1st Route Army - Fu Zuoyi
35th Army - Fu Zuoyi (concurrent)
 211th Infantry Brigade
 419, 421, 422 Infantry Regiments 
 218th Infantry Brigade - 
 420, 435, 436 Infantry Regiments
 205th brigade (less 407th Regiment)
 7th Independent Brigade - Ma Yanshou 
 10th Reserve Regiment 
 21st, 29th Artillery Regiment
 Antiaircraft battalion (less 1st and 3rd battery)

2nd Route Army - Tang Enbo (en route to Suiyuan)
 13th Army, with the attached 72nd Division and the 27th Artillery Regiment.

3rd Route Army - Li Fuying (Garrison of Jinbei, Tianzhen, Gaoyang area)
 68th Division - Li Fuying (concurrent)
 24th Artillery Regiment
 1st and 3rd batteries of the Antiaircraft battalion.

Cavalry Army - Zhao Chengshou
 assistant deputy commander - Men Bingyue 
 1st Cavalry Division - Peng Yubin
 2nd Cavalry Division
 7th Cavalry Division - Men Bingyue

Reserve Army - Wang Jingguo (Garrison of Zhusui, Baotou area)
 70th Division - Wang Jingguo (concurrent)
 (Less 205th brigade, its 407th Regiment remained with the division)  
 8th Independent Brigade - Meng Xianji

References 
 Jowett, Phillip S., Rays of The Rising Sun, Armed Forces of Japan’s Asian Allies 1931-45, Volume I: China & Manchuria, 2004. Helion & Co. Ltd., 26 Willow Rd., Solihull, West Midlands, England.
 中国抗日战争正面战场作战记 (China's Anti-Japanese War Combat Operations) 
 Guo Rugui, editor-in-chief Huang Yuzhang 
 Jiangsu People's Publishing House 
 Date published : 2005-7-1 
  
 Online in Chinese: https://web.archive.org/web/20090116005113/http://www.wehoo.net/book/wlwh/a30012/A0170.htm

Suiyuan
Suiyuan